The Adventures of Luther Arkwright is a limited series comic book written and drawn by Bryan Talbot. The story is adult in tone, with many mythological, historical and political references, and a little explicit sex. 

English writer Warren Ellis calls Arkwright "probably the single most influential graphic novel to have come out of Britain to date... probably Anglophone comics' single most important experimental work."

Publication history
Luther Arkwright's genesis owes something to the influence of Michael Moorcock's Jerry Cornelius stories, though Moorcock and Talbot agree that the similarities between the characters are limited. 

The character made his first appearance in the mid-1970s in "The Papist Affair", a short strip for Brainstorm Comix where Arkwright teamed up with a group of cigar-chewing biker nuns to recover the sacred relics of "St. Adolf of Nuremberg" from "a buncha male chauvinist priests".

The first parts of The Adventures of Luther Arkwright followed as a five-part serial in the British underground comic Near Myths in 1978–1980, and were continued in the comics anthology pssst! in 1982. After five more episodes, however, the story was interrupted when pssst! was canceled, less than half complete. Before shutting down, however, pssst!'s publisher, Serge Boissevain, collected all the Luther Arkwright stories — including the material from Near Myths — in a trade paperback called The Adventures of Luther Arkwright Book 1: Rat Trap.

Between 1987 and 1989 Talbot completed the story, which was published as a series of nine standard comic books by Valkyrie Press, followed, at readers' request, by a tenth issue, titled ARKeology, containing articles about the history and production of the comic and some extended back story and character information.

In 1987, Serge Boissevain paid for the printing of the Valkyrie Press trade paperback, The Adventures of Luther Arkwright Book 2: Transfiguration. And then, in 1989, under the publisher name Proutt, he published the final trade paperback, Book 3: Götterdämmerung.

The entire series was subsequently published in the United States by Dark Horse Comics. And in 1999 Dark Horse published Talbot's sequel to Luther Arkwright, called Heart of Empire.

In 2005 the artwork was digitally remastered by Comics Centrum for an edition in Czech (Dobrodružství Luther Arkwrighta), allowing proper reproduction of both light and dark parts of "tonal" pages. The new artwork was also used for a French edition by Kymera Comics. Bryan Talbot has described the Czech edition as "the best ever published".

In 2006 it was republished as a webcomic using the digitally remastered files at the official fan page.

A third story, The Legend of Luther Arkwright, was announced in 2022, and was published in July by Jonathan Cape.

Collected editions 
 The Adventures of Luther Arkwright Book 1: Rat Trap (Never Editions, 1982)  — introduction by Ramsey Campbell
 The Adventures of Luther Arkwright Book 2: Transfiguration (Valkyrie Press, Dec. 1987)  — introduction by Alan Moore
 The Adventures of Luther Arkwright Book 3: Götterdämmerung (Proutt, Preston, 1989)  — introduction by Iain Banks
 The Adventures of Luther Arkwright (Dark Horse, 1997) ; republished in 2004 and 2007

Synopsis
Luther Arkwright is a work of apocalyptic science fiction set in parallel universes. The eponymous hero has the unique talent of being able to move between parallels purely by force of will, and is aided by Rose Wylde, a telepath whose many incarnations across the parallels are able to communicate with one another. Luther and Rose are agents of a parallel known as "zero-zero", whose stable position in the multiverse has allowed the development of a world at peace with itself and sufficiently high technology to monitor the parallels for signs of the malign influence of the "Disruptors".

Most of the action in the story is set in a parallel world where the English Civil War has been indefinitely prolonged by the actions of the Disruptors, who are also responsible for unleashing "Firefrost", a legendary artifact which is destabilising the multiverse. Arkwright intervenes on the Royalist side in order to draw out the Disruptors and locate and destroy Firefrost. Along the way his unit is ambushed, and he is killed, only to return to life with his powers enhanced.

The storytelling of the early episodes is complex, with flashbacks to Arkwright's upbringing by the Disruptors, escape to the parallel of his birth and early missions for zero-zero intermingling with the course of his mission in neo-Cromwellian England, with story-telling techniques and art styles shifting to match. The scenes of Arkwright's death and rebirth are particularly abstract and full of religious and mythological symbolism.  The comic is unusual in being one of the few adventure stories where the readers and the protagonist both know from the beginning that he's going to die, only the event itself is not known.

The later parts of the story have a more straightforward, linear form. At the end Arkwright, having completed his mission, renounces violence.

Awards
Bryan Talbot and the Valkyrie Press edition of Arkwright were nominated for eight Eagle Awards in 1988, winning four: Favourite Artist, Best New Comic, Favourite Character for Arkwright himself and Best Comic Cover. In addition, the book was given the 1989 Mekon Award for "Best British Work" by the Society of Strip Illustration.

In other media

Audio adaptation

In 2005, The Adventures of Luther Arkwright was made into a full-cast, three-CD audio adventure by Big Finish Productions, starring David Tennant (cast near the time of the CD's release as the Tenth Doctor in Doctor Who) and Paul Darrow (Avon in Blake's 7).

 Cast
Luther Arkwright — David Tennant
Cromwell — Paul Darrow
Rose — Siri O'Neal
Karl/Czar Nicholas — Robert Jezek
Computer/Octobriana/Emily — Michelle Livingstone
Archduke — Robert Lockwood, Jr.
Montpelier/Wittgenstein — Alfred Hoffman
Miranda/Lady-in-waiting — Zoe Robinson
Standish/the Scientist — Andrew Westfield
The Disruptor/Harry Fairfax/the Interrogator/The Five — Jeremy James
Pennington — Robert Curbishley
Whitelaw — Mark Donovan
King Charles — Steve Dineen
Princess Anne — India Fisher

Feature film adaptation
In 2006, it was announced that Benderspink would be creating a live action film with producers Andrew Prowse and Sophie Patrick. According to Talbot, the rights for the project lapsed in June 2010.

References

Notes

Sources 
   (Valkyrie Press)
   (Dark Horse Comics)
  (Dark Horse Comics)

External links
The Adventures of Luther Arkwright at Bryan Talbot's official fansite
The Adventures of Luther Arkwright webcomic— the whole of the comic available to read online as a webcomic. 
ARKeology: partial index and electronic copy of "ARKeology", the "un-numbered and un-dated (mostly) text 'appendix' issue"
 Luther Arkwright overview on The Cartoon Museum website

1978 comics debuts
2005 audio plays
Big Finish Productions
British comics titles
Comic book limited series
Comics about parallel universes
Comics by Bryan Talbot
Dark Horse Comics limited series
Dark Horse Comics titles
Defunct British comics
Parallel universes in fiction
Science fiction comics
Steampunk comics